Henry John "Bruts" Welsch (July 3, 1921 – September 27, 1996) was an American football and baseball player and coach. He served as the head football (1944) and head baseball (1946) coach at Saint John's University in Collegeville, Minnesota.

Head coaching record

Football

References

External links
 
 

1921 births
1996 deaths
Saint John's Johnnies baseball coaches
Saint John's Johnnies football coaches
St. Cloud Rox players
St. Paul Saints players
Zanesville Dodgers players
Sportspeople from Saint Paul, Minnesota
Baseball players from Saint Paul, Minnesota